Selfoss is a town in southern Iceland on the banks of the Ölfusá river. It is the seat of the municipality of Árborg. The Icelandic Route 1 runs through the town on its way between Hveragerði and Hella. The town is a centre of commerce and small industries with a population of 11,000 (2023), making it the largest residential area in South Iceland.

Geography 
Selfoss is located about 11 km inland from the southwestern coast of Iceland, and 50 km from Reykjavík. It is the major town and the administrative seat of the Southern Region. The closest other towns are Eyrarbakki, Stokkseyri and Hveragerði.

Climate 
Similar to the rest of the southern coast of Iceland, Selfoss has a subpolar oceanic climate (Köppen: Cfc) with cool summers and cold winters, although relatively mild for its high latitude. Precipitation is abundant year round, with October usually seeing the most precipitation.

History

Overview 
Selfoss was settled by Þórir Ásason sometime after 1000, but the Sagas of Icelanders mention that Ingólfur Arnarson was there during the winter of 873-74, under the Ingólfsfjall mountain, which is west of the Ölfusá river.

In the summer of 1891, due to the lobbying of Tryggvi Gunnarsson, a member of the Alþing, the first suspension bridge was built over the Ölfusá. That was a major breakthrough in Icelandic infrastructure. The bridge made the town a logical centre for services for the surrounding agricultural region. The current bridge was built in 1945 after the original structure collapsed.

In 1900, the town was home to only 40 inhabitants, but by 2011 the population had climbed to 6,500.

In 1931, the dairy firm Mjólkurbú Flóamanna and general store Kaupfélag Árnesinga were established. The two companies were the main employers in the area for several decades. During World War II the British stationed troops at Selfoss to guard the strategic bridge.

Present day 
Today, with more efficient transportation, Selfoss benefits from its proximity to the Reykjavík area and is predicted to grow further in the coming years as businesses and residents relocate to the town because of lower property prices. This has also led to many relocating their homes from Reykjavík to the much calmer Selfoss. It enjoys low rates of unemployment and is the home of one of the largest colleges in the country; FSU Fjölbrautaskóli Suðurlands.
In early August, the town holds a festival called "Sumar á Selfossi", meaning "Summer in Selfoss". Local residents decorate their gardens with ribbons, coloured according to neighbourhood, and a fete is held on the public grassland behind the civic library. The fete involves the selling of homemade goods on small stalls, performances by musicians and magicians on a temporary stage, and in 2011, a "Strongest Man" competition was held, with video recording by Icelandic television channel Stöð 2. In the evening, the revelry continues with a large bonfire and free fireworks display.

Former World Chess Champion Bobby Fischer is buried near Selfoss at Laugardælir cemetery.

2008 earthquake 

According to the United States Geological Survey, an earthquake with a moment magnitude of 6.3 occurred near Selfoss on the afternoon of Thursday 29 May 2008, causing considerable damage to some buildings and roads. The earthquake was felt across southern Iceland, including in the capital Reykjavík and the airbase at Keflavik. At least 30 people were injured; however, there were no reports of human deaths. A number of sheep in the Selfoss area were killed.

New town center 
In 2018, the creation of a new town center has been decided. It will consist of reconstructions of historical buildings from all across the country.

Sports 
The town biggest sports club is the UMF Selfoss multi-sport club, which was founded in 1936. In May 2019, the Selfoss men's handball team won the national handball championship for the first time. In August 2019, the women's football team added the club's second major title in one year when it won the Icelandic Football Cup.
Its men's football team has played in the Icelandic leagues since 1966. The team spent two seasons in the top-tier Úrvalsdeild, in 2010 and 2012, but were relegated in both seasons.

The town also has a basketball club named Körfuknattleiksfélag Selfoss. Its men's team has had spells in the top-tier Úrvalsdeild karla. Part of the local college and the club serve as a development academy for young players that attend the school.

Transport 
Selfoss sits on Route 1, the Icelandic ring road, and is the first major stop east of Reykjavik.

Selfoss Airport is a privately run airstrip located just to the southwest of the town.

Notable people 
Guðni Ágústsson, politician.
Vésteinn Hafsteinsson, former discus thrower and a coach.
Bjarni Harðarson, politician, writer, and bookseller.
Jón Arnar Magnússon, former decathlete.
Ómar Ingi Magnússon, handballer, was born in Selfoss.
Davíð Oddsson, politician was brought up in Selfoss.
Björgvin G. Sigurðsson, politician.
Thorir Hergeirsson, handball coach for the Norway women's national handball team.
Þórir Ólafsson, handballer.
Gunnar Ólason, a member of the band Skítamórall.
Björk, singer, lived in Selfoss as a child.
Jón Daði Böðvarsson, footballer, was born in Selfoss.
Daði Freyr, musician, was raised in the area of Selfoss.

See also
 List of cities in Iceland
 Laugardælir, closest town to Selfoss.
 Bobby Fischer Center, museum in Selfoss.

References

External links

 Árborg municipal website
Map of Selfoss

 
South Iceland Seismic Zone